Tony Draws a Horse is a 1950 British comedy film directed by John Paddy Carstairs and starring Cecil Parker, Anne Crawford and Derek Bond. It was adapted from a 1939 play of the same name by Lesley Storm.

Plot
When their eight-year-old son Tony (Anthony Lang) draws a horse on his father's office wall, complete with reproductive organs, surgeon father (Cecil Parker) and psychiatrist mother (Anne Crawford) come to blows over how to deal with the boy's behaviour. The father favours discipline and a beating for the child, the mother wants to spare the rod and reward Tony for so freely expressing himself. The resulting marital bust up causes the wife to leave for her parents home, and from thence to Dieppe.

Cast
 Cecil Parker as Dr. Howard Fleming
 Anne Crawford as Clare Fleming
 Derek Bond as Tim Shields
 Barbara Murray as Joan Parsons
 Mervyn Johns as Alfred Parsons
 Barbara Everest as Mrs. Parsons
 Edward Rigby as Grandpa
 Dandy Nichols as Mrs. Smith
 Gabrielle Blunt as Grace
 Marjorie Gresley as Mrs. Carey Brown
 David Hurst as Ivan
 Anthony Lang as Tony Fleming
 Kynaston Reeves as Dr. Bletchley

Critical reception
In The New York Times, Bosley Crowther wrote, "To spank or not to spank, that is the question which gayly precipitates a clash of parental personalities and a consequent explosion of domestic strife in the Park Avenue Theatre's new attraction, the British comedy, "Tony Draws a Horse"....It is out of this cozy situation that Mr. Williams (from Mr. Storm) has propelled a tempest of family complications that rocks with hilarity...it is a toss-up as to which is more fun—Cecil Parker as the pompous father or Anne Crawford as the mother with new ideas. Mr. Parker does a richly amusing characterization of a righteous fuddy-dud and Miss Crawford is blithe and beguiling as a lady who is a little light in the head. Barbara Everest fumes and fusses like a school-marm as the matron who worships routine, Mervyn Johns is gentle as her husband and Edward Rigby is a card as grandpa. Dandy Nichols, David Hurst and Marjorie Gresley are amusing in other character roles; Derek Bond and Barbara Murray are good as love-birds and Anthony Lang is fit to slaughter as the kid. Under the facile direction of John Paddy Carstairs, the whole lot turn out a rollicking little picture that is loaded with chuckles and guffaws"; while Leonard Maltin called the film an "Occasionally funny but overly talky (not to mention outdated) satire": and more recently, the Radio Times wrote, "Prolific comedy director John Paddy Carstairs here turns in a workmanlike, but nevertheless likeable, adaptation of Lesley Storm's stage play."

References

External links

1950 films
1950 comedy films
Films directed by John Paddy Carstairs
Films shot at Pinewood Studios
British comedy films
Films set in London
British films based on plays
Films set in France
British black-and-white films
1950s English-language films
1950s British films